The Europe/Africa Zone was one of the three zones of the regional Davis Cup competition in 1989.

In the Europe/Africa Zone there were two different tiers, called groups, in which teams competed against each other to advance to the upper tier. The winner in the Africa Zone Group II advanced to the Europe/Africa Zone Group I in 1990.

Participating nations

Draw

  promoted to Group I in 1990.

First round

Tunisia vs. Algeria

Second round

Ghana vs. Egypt

Libya vs. Cameroon

Algeria vs. Morocco

Kenya vs. Ivory Coast

Third round

Ghana vs. Cameroon

Kenya vs. Morocco

Fourth round

Ghana vs. Morocco

References

External links
Davis Cup official website

Davis Cup Europe/Africa Zone
Africa Zone Group II